The Last Days of Pompeii (1935) is an RKO Radio Pictures film starring Preston Foster and directed by Ernest B. Schoedsack and Merian C. Cooper, creators of the original King Kong. Although inspired by the novel of the same name by Edward Bulwer-Lytton, the film has nothing to do with the book. Indeed, a Foreword appearing after the film's opening credits states, "Although ... the characters and plot have no relation to those in the novel by Sir Edward Bulwer-Lytton, acknowledgement is made of his description of Pompeii which has inspired the physical setting of this picture".

Plot
In the time of Jesus Christ, blacksmith Marcus is content with his life, beautiful wife Julia and six-month-old son Flavius. When Julia and their child are run down by a chariot in the streets of Pompeii, Marcus spends the little money he has to pay for a doctor and medicine. Needing more, in desperation, he becomes a gladiator. He wins his fight, but his wife and child still die. Blaming his poverty, he becomes an embittered professional gladiator and grows wealthier with each victory. Marcus adopts Flavius, a boy whose father Marcus killed in the arena. An injury ends Marcus' career as a gladiator and he takes a job working for Cleon, a slave trader.

Marcus raids an African village for slaves, where a father battles Marcus' raiders until his young son's life is threatened and he is forced to surrender. Marcus identifies with the father's grief at being unable to protect his son. He stops slaving and turns to trading instead.

Marcus rescues a fortune teller, who foretells that Flavius will be saved by the greatest man in Judea. Marcus and Flavius travel to Jerusalem to see the man that Marcus thinks fits that description: Pontius Pilate, the Roman governor. At an inn along the way, a man tells him that the greatest man is staying in the stable, but Marcus does not believe him.

Pilate employs Marcus to lead a band of cutthroats to raid the chief of the Ammonites. Marcus comes away with many fine horses and much treasure, but finds that Flavius has been thrown from a horse and is near death. Marcus takes the boy to a noted healer and begs for his help. The healer is Jesus, who saves Flavius's life. When Marcus later reports back to Pilate with his share of the treasure, he finds Pilate has sentenced Christ to death.

As Marcus leaves the city, one of the apostles begs him to rescue Jesus, carrying his cross through the streets, but Marcus refuses. As Marcus and Flavius leave Jerusalem, they see three crosses on Calvary behind them.

Years pass. Marcus has grown wealthy as the head of the arena in Pompeii. One day, Marcus welcomes Pontius Pilate as a guest to his lavish home. When Flavius, now a young man, mentions his childhood memories of being healed by a man who preached love and compassion, Marcus assures him that there was no such person. The still-remorseful Pilate insists there was such a man, but he crucified him. The memory of the three crosses on the hill comes flooding back to Flavius.

Flavius is arrested and sentenced to die for secretly helping slaves escape from his father's arena. As he is herded into the arena to fight with the others, Mount Vesuvius erupts. As Marcus wanders stunned through the streets, he sees the jailer who refused to release Flavius trying to free his own son from the rubble. The dying man begs Marcus for mercy for his son. Marcus angrily refuses, but then remembers begging Jesus for mercy for Flavius and rescues the boy. Marcus sees his faithful servant Burbix leading a group of slaves carrying his treasure on litters. He orders them to use the litters to rescue the injured instead. As they get to a ship, Marcus sees that one of those saved is Flavius and offers a prayer of thanksgiving. The prefect and his men try to get through a gate to take the ship for themselves. Marcus holds the gate shut, giving the boat enough time to get away at the cost of his life. He has a vision of Christ reaching out to him just before he dies.

Cast 
 Preston Foster as Marcus
 Alan Hale as Burbix
 Basil Rathbone as Pontius Pilate
 John Wood as adult Flavius
 Louis Calhern as Prefect (Allus Martius)
 David Holt as young Flavius
 Dorothy Wilson as Clodia, a slave Flavius rescues and falls in love with
 Wyrley Birch as Leaster
 Gloria Shea as Julia
 Frank Conroy as Gaius Tanno
 William V. Mong as Cleon, the Slave Dealer
 Murray Kinnell as Simon, Judean Peasant
 Henry Kolker as Warder
 Edward Van Sloan as Calvus
 Zeffie Tilbury as Wise Woman
 Ward Bond as Murmex of Carthage, the gladiator who defeats Marcus
 Edwin Maxwell as The Augur (uncredited) 
 Jason Robards Sr. as Tax Gatherer (uncredited)

Reception
The Last Days of Pompeii appeared to be a moderate box-office success upon its release in 1935, but RKO ultimately lost $237,000 after the film's first theatrical run. However, the picture finally made a profit for the studio following its 1949 re-release, when it shared a double bill with the re-release of another 1935 production, Cooper and Schoedsack's adventure fantasy film She.

Some of the footage of Rome was re-used in the 1952 George Bernard Shaw adaptation Androcles and the Lion.

References

External links 

 
 
 
 

1935 films
1930s historical drama films
American historical drama films
American black-and-white films
Films based on The Last Days of Pompeii
Films directed by Ernest B. Schoedsack
Films directed by Merian C. Cooper
Films set in ancient Rome
Films set in the Roman Empire
Films set in 79 AD
Pompeii in popular culture
RKO Pictures films
American disaster films
Films about volcanoes
Films about gladiatorial combat
Cultural depictions of Pontius Pilate
1935 drama films
1930s English-language films
1930s American films